That Evening Sun is a 2009 American drama film based on a 2002 short story "I Hate to See That Evening Sun Go Down" by William Gay. The movie, produced by Dogwood Entertainment, stars Hal Holbrook as Abner Meecham and is directed by Scott Teems who also wrote the screenplay. That Evening Sun premiered in March 2009 at South By Southwest, where it received the Audience Award for Narrative Feature and a special Jury Prize for Ensemble Cast. Joe Leydon of Variety hailed it as "an exceptionally fine example of regional indie filmmaking," and praised Holbrook's performance as a "career-highlight star turn as an irascible octogenarian farmer who will not go gentle into that good night." That Evening Sun also was screened at the 2009 Nashville Film Festival, where Holbrook was honored with a special Lifetime Achievement Award, and the film itself received another Audience Award.

The film opened in limited release in November 2009, and was released on DVD and Blu-ray Disc on September 7, 2010.

Plot
Abner Meecham, an aging Tennessee farmer discarded at a nursing facility by his lawyer son Paul, flees the old folks home and catches a ride back to his country farm to live out his days in peace. Upon his return, he discovers that Paul has leased the farm to an old enemy and his family. Not one to suffer fools or go down easy, Abner moves into the old tenant shack on the property and declares that he will not leave until the farm is returned to his possession. But Lonzo Choat, the new tenant, has no intention to move out or give in to the demands of the old man.

Abner catches Lonzo beating his daughter with a garden hose after she was caught returning from dating a forbidden boy, and Abner scares Lonzo off by shooting a pistol in Lonzo's direction. The next day Abner has Lonzo picked up by the police, and Lonzo's wife Ludie is upset that she has to pay for bail, which they cannot afford. When the Choats come back from town, Lonzo is visibly upset, and kills Abner's dog Nipper and hangs him from the porch of the tenant shack. Abner disappears for two days, and the Choats suspect he has finally given up. Instead, he returns with Nipper's stuffed corpse, and sets him on the front porch and tells it to stand guard. Abner and Lonzo get into an arguing match in which Lonzo threatens to burn the shack down with Abner inside. The argument culminates with Abner pointing a pistol at Lonzo, but Lonzo easily disarms Abner. The police are summoned the next day, and Abner is forced to move out, partially by Paul, who believes he has lost his mind. Abner admits defeat and says he'll move out by the next morning. Instead he tells his neighbor that Lonzo has threatened to kill him by burning the shack. Abner, haunted by recurring dreams of his long-dead wife, then sets the shack ablaze, but stumbles while trying to exit, and he is rescued by Lonzo.

When Abner awakes, he is in the hospital with Paul by his side. He accepts that he will move into a retirement community, but insists that he will plant corn in his small garden there, instead of tomatoes as his son suggested. In the final scene Abner visits his house one more time; the house has been vacated by the Choats.

Cast

Hal Holbrook as Abner Meecham
Ray McKinnon as Lonzo Choat
Walton Goggins as Paul Meecham
Mia Wasikowska as Pamela Choat
Carrie Preston as Ludie Choat
Barry Corbin as Thurl Chessor
Dixie Carter as Ellen Meecham

The film would be Dixie Carter's final film credit.

Reception
That Evening Sun has received mostly positive reviews from critics. On review aggregate website Rotten Tomatoes, the film has an approval rating of 82% based on 38 reviews. The site's critics consensus reads, "Powered by a formidable leading turn from Hal Holbrook, That Evening Sun is a prime cut of southern gothic that offers plenty of meditative atmosphere for audiences to brood over." On Metacritic, the film has a score of 75 based on 12 critic reviews, indicating "generally favorable reviews". 

Joe Leydon of Variety called the film a "deliberately paced, richly atmospheric drama (that) also boasts first-rate work by a splendid supporting cast and impressive production values." Roger Ebert of the Chicago Sun-Times gave the film three and a half stars out of four, and called the film "...a drama set on a Tennessee farm that begins by looking like your standard old codger story and turns out, as Clint Eastwood's Gran Torino did, to be a lot more."

Awards
2006 IFP Market Award - Emerging Narrative Screenplay Award
2009 Little Rock Film Festival - Best Narrative Feature Award
2009 South by Southwest - Narrative Feature Audience Award
2009 South by Southwest - Special Jury Award for Best Ensemble Cast
2009 Sarasota Film Festival - Audience Award for Best Narrative Feature
2009 Atlanta Film Festival - Jury Award for Best Narrative
2009 Nashville Film Festival - Official Selection; Audience Award; Lifetime Achievement Award (Hal Holbrook); Governor's Award (Dixie Carter)
2009 Memphis Indie Film Festival - Jury Award for Best Narrative Feature
2009 Sidewalk Moving Picture Festival - Best Director
2009 Newport International Film Festival - Special Narrative Feature Jury Prize; Student Jury Narrative Grand Prize
2009 Southeastern Film Critics Association Awards - Wyatt Award (awarded to a film that the captures the spirit of the South)
2009 Independent Spirit Awards 2009 - Nominated - Best Supporting Female - Mia Wasikowska; Best Supporting Male - Ray McKinnon

References

External links
Official site

2009 films
2009 drama films
2000s English-language films
American drama films
Films about old age
Films based on short fiction
Films directed by Scott Teems
Films about feuds
Southern Gothic films
Films scored by Michael Penn
Films set in Tennessee
Films shot in Tennessee
Films with screenplays by Scott Teems
2009 independent films
2000s American films